Eravur is a town in the Batticaloa District of Eastern Province, Sri Lanka, it is located about  north-west of Batticaloa. It is governed by the Eravur Urban Council.

Towns in Batticaloa District
Eravur Town DS Division